The Alaska Zoo is a zoo in Anchorage, Alaska, located on  of the Anchorage Hillside. It is a popular attraction in Alaska, with nearly 200,000 visitors per year.

The zoo is currently home to more than 100 birds and mammals representing some 50 species. The zoo has the widest variety of animals native to the state of Alaska as well as some exotics such as Amur tigers, Bactrian camels, and yaks.

In addition to viewing, the zoo specializes in education, research, wildlife conservation, and animal rehabilitation; many of the animals currently in the zoo were found orphaned or injured.

History

In 1966, Anchorage grocer Jack Snyder won a contest offering a prize of "$3,000 or a baby elephant". He chose the elephant, a female Asian elephant named Annabelle. Annabelle was initially kept at the Diamond H Horse Ranch, located in the Hillside area of Anchorage and owned by Sammye Seawell, which had the only heated stalls available.

With Annabelle's increasing popularity, Seawell formed a non-profit corporation to build a place "where the public could visit animals and learn about them." It was incorporated on March 28, 1968, as the Alaska Children's Zoo, which opened in 1969 with Annabelle and other donated animals. The zoo was located on land adjacent to Seawell's ranch. The zoo's name was changed to Alaska Zoo in June 1980.

In 1983, a female African elephant named Maggie arrived at the Alaska Zoo as a companion for Annabelle.

The zoo attracted some attention, even outside Alaska, in 1994 when Binky, then one of the zoo's polar bears, injured several visitors who entered his enclosure, famously pacing with an Australian woman's shoe dangling from his mouth (the current polar bear exhibit is human-proof).

In 1997, Annabelle died, leaving her companion, Maggie alone. In 2004, in spite of mounting criticism, Alaska Zoo officials decided to keep Maggie in Alaska for at least three more years, rather than sending her to an elephant sanctuary in a warmer climate, where she could also socialize with other elephants. As of June 6, 2007, she was moved to the PAWS sanctuary in California.

Notable animals

Annabelle (1964–1997), an Asian elephant 
Annabelle, an Asian elephant, was born in India in 1964. In 1966, in a Chiffon Tissue contest sponsored by Crown Zellerbach, she was offered as an alternative prize between "$3,000 or a baby elephant". The prize-winner, Anchorage grocer Jack Snyder, chose the elephant. Annabelle was initially kept at the Diamond H Horse Ranch, located in the Hillside area of Anchorage and owned by Sammye Seawell, which had the only heated stalls available. Annabelle was one of the first animals when the zoo was founded as the Alaska Children's Zoo in 1969, along with several orphaned and injured animals in need of homes, including a black bear, seal, Arctic fox, and petting zoo goats.

Annabelle died of complications of a foot infection on December 15, 1997.

Binky (1975–1995), a polar bear

Maggie (1983–2021), an African elephant
Maggie, an African elephant, came to the Alaska Zoo in 1983 as a companion for Annabelle.  Maggie originated in Zimbabwe, Africa, where her herd had been culled – selectively destroyed to reduce numbers – leaving her in need of a home. Maggie is also known as having the first elephant treadmill in the world.

In 2007, Maggie was moved to the PAWS sanctuary in California. She died in August of 2021.

Current species

 Brown bear
 American black bear
 Polar bear
 Dall sheep
 Mountain goat
 North American porcupine
 Flying squirrel
 Wolverine
 North American river otter
 Siberian tiger
 Snow leopard
 Canada lynx
 Bald eagle
 Golden eagle
 Bactrian camel
 Alpaca
 Common raven
 Trumpeter swan
 Red-tailed hawk
 Sharp-shinned hawk
 Moose
 Reindeer
 Sitka deer
 Great grey owl
 Great horned owl
 Short-eared owl
 Peale's falcon
 Domestic yak
 Muskox
 Harbor seal
 Gray wolf
 Coyote
 Red fox

Conservation efforts
The Alaska Zoo is proactive in its conservation efforts and research, as well as education programs. The zoo is a part of the Species Survival Program for tigers and snow leopards, and the Polar Bear International helping with the conservation of polar bears. Also, the zoo is involved in animal husbandry and research on a variety of scales in part with the University of Alaska Anchorage.

See also
Wildlife of Alaska
Mammals of Alaska

References

External links

Zoos in Alaska
Culture of Anchorage, Alaska
Tourist attractions in Anchorage, Alaska
Buildings and structures in Anchorage, Alaska
Protected areas of Anchorage, Alaska
Roadside attractions in Alaska
Zoos established in 1969
1969 establishments in Alaska